Krzysztof Wiesław Hołowczyc (born 4 June 1962 in Olsztyn, Poland) is a Polish rally driver. He won the Polish Rally Championship in 1995, 1996 and 1999 and the European Rally Championship in 1997. He was also member of European Parliament (2007–2009) from Civic Platform list.

Biography
Hołowczyc won the Polish Rally Championship in 1995, 1996, 1999. Also he won the Rally Poland in 1996, 1998 and 2005.

In the World Rally Championship, Hołowczyc was active in the late 1990s, usually competing in a Subaru Impreza WRC. His seventh place at the 1998 Rally Argentina marked the best-ever result for a Polish driver in the series.

After the Rally Poland returned to the WRC calendar for the 2009 season, Hołowczyc signed to make a one-off return in a Ford Focus WRC run by Stobart M-Sport Ford. He finished sixth in the 2009 Rally Poland and scored Poland's second WRC points ever.

Hołowczyc took part in the Dakar Rally and finished 60th (2005), 6th (2009), 5th (2011), 10th (2012), 6th (2014) and 3rd (2015). He also took part but did not finish the Rally due to car failure in 2006, 2010 and due to crash in 2007 and 2013.

Also, he won the Baja Poland in 2010, 2011, 2012, 2014 and 2015, and the Silk Way Rally in 2011.

Racing record

Complete WRC results

Complete PWRC results

Complete Dakar Rally results

Complete FIA European Rallycross Championship results

Supercar

Awards
For his sport achievements, he has received: 
 Silver Cross of Merit in 2000;
 Golden Cross of Merit in 2005.

References

External links
 http://www.holowczyc.pl
 http://www.kimrally.pl/kierowcy/holowczyc.php
 https://www.ewrc-results.com/profile/1212-krzysztof-holowczyc/1

1962 births
Living people
World Rally Championship drivers
Polish rally drivers
Dakar Rally drivers
European Rally Championship drivers
Civic Platform MEPs
MEPs for Poland 2004–2009
Sportspeople from Olsztyn
European Rallycross Championship drivers
M-Sport drivers